Michael Harper (born May 11, 1961) is an American former gridiron football player. He played professionally as a wide receiver in the National Football League (NFL) for the New York Jets and in the Canadian Football League (NFL) for the Calgary Stampeders. Harper played college football for the USC Trojans.

References

External links

1961 births
Living people
American football running backs
American football wide receivers
Canadian football wide receivers
Calgary Stampeders players
New York Jets players
USC Trojans football players
Players of American football from Kansas City, Missouri
Players of Canadian football from Kansas City, Missouri